Mackinac County is a county in the Upper Peninsula of the U.S. state of Michigan. As of the 2020 Census, the population was 10,834. The county seat is St. Ignace. Formerly known as Michilimackinac County, in 1818 it was one of the first counties of the Michigan Territory, as it had long been a center of French and British colonial fur trading, a Catholic church and Protestant mission, and associated settlement.

The county's name is  shortened from "Michilimackinac", which referred to the Straits of Mackinac area as well as the French settlement at the tip of the lower peninsula.

History

Michilimackinac County was created on October 26, 1818, by proclamation of territorial governor Lewis Cass. The county originally encompassed the Lower Peninsula of Michigan north of Macomb County and almost the entire present Upper Peninsula. As later counties were settled and organized, they were divided from this territory.

On March 9, 1843, Michigan divided the Upper Peninsula into six counties.  At this time, the County of Michilimackinac included the portion of the Upper Peninsula closest to the Straits of Mackinac, plus several islands, but none of the Lower Peninsula.

At the time of founding, the county seat was the community of Michilimackinac Island on Michilimackinac Island, later known as Mackinac Island, Michigan. This has been an important center for fur trading before the 1830s, when European demand declined. The county was organized in 1849 as Mackinac County. In 1882 the county seat was moved from Mackinac Island to St. Ignace, Michigan, which had been founded as a French Jesuit mission village during the colonial years.

Mackinac County is home to the Mackinac Bands of Chippewa and Ottawa Indians, a Native American tribe located in St. Ignace.

Geography
Mackinac County lies at the boundary of Lake Huron and Lake Michigan.

St. Ignace is the northern terminus of the Mackinac Bridge. Mackinac Island is within the county.

Due to its sparse population, the county has no weather stations.

Adjacent counties
By land
Chippewa County (northeast)
Luce County (northwest)
Schoolcraft County (west)
By water

Presque Isle County (southeast)
Cheboygan County (south)
Emmet County (south)
Charlevoix County (southwest)

National protected area
 Hiawatha National Forest (part)

Transportation

Airports
The Mackinac County Airport (83D) in St. Ignace and Mackinac Island Airport (MCD) on Mackinac Island are located within Mackinac County. The nearest airports with scheduled commercial passenger service are Chippewa County International Airport (CIU) in Sault Ste. Marie and Pellston Regional Airport (PLN).

Major highways

M-185 does not allow motor vehicles with the exception of emergency vehicles and service vehicles.

Ferry
Numerous companies operate ferries to Bois Blanc Island and Mackinac Island.  Ferries to and from Mackinac Island sail from St. Ignace and Mackinaw City, while the Bois Blanc Island ferry sails from Cheboygan.

Rail
Canadian National Railway

Demographics

The 2010 United States Census reported that Mackinac County had a population of 11,113, a decrease of 830 (-6.9%) from the 2000 United States Census. In 2010 there were 5,024 households and 3,219 families in the county. The population density was 11 per square mile (5/km2). There were 11,010 housing units at an average density of 11/sq mi (4/km2>). 76.5% of the population were White, 17.3% Native American, 0.5% Black or African American, 0.2% Asian, 0.2% of some other race and 5.3% of two or more races. 1.1% were Hispanic or Latino (of any race). 18.5% were of German, 8.8% English, 8.0% French, French Canadian or Cajun, 7.6% Irish and 5.1% Polish ancestry.

There were 5,024 households, of which 20.9% had children under the age of 18 living with them, 51.3% were married couples living together, 8.1% had a female householder with no husband present, and 35.9% were non-families. 31.0% of all households were made up of individuals, and 14.3% had someone living alone who was 65 years of age or older. The average household size was 2.19 and the average family size was 2.7.

18.7% of the population were under the age of 18, 5.5% from 18 to 24, 19.3% from 25 to 44, 34.0% from 45 to 64, and 22.3% who were 65 years of age or older. The median age was 49 years. The population was 50.5% male and 49.5% female.

The median household income was $39,055 and the median family income was $50,984. The per capita income was $22,195. About 10.5% of families and 14.1% of the population were below the poverty line, including 19.3% of those under age 18 and 6.2% of those age 65 or over.

Religion
Mackinac County is part of the Roman Catholic Diocese of Marquette.

Government

Mackinac County is reliably Republican. Since the 1964 landslide of Lyndon B. Johnson, it has only supported a Democrat twice. Bill Clinton won the county in his 1992 and 1996 victories; the latter remains the last time a Democratic presidential candidate has won the county.

The county government operates the jail, maintains rural roads, operates the major local courts, keeps files of deeds and mortgages, maintains vital records, administers public health regulations, and participates with the state in the provision of welfare and other social services. The county board of commissioners controls the budget but has only limited authority to make laws or ordinances.  In Michigan, most local government functions — police and fire, building and zoning, tax assessment, street maintenance, etc. — are the responsibility of individual cities and townships.

Elected officials
 Prosecuting Attorney: J. Stuart Spencer
 Sheriff: Edward Wilk
 County Clerk: Hillary Vowell
 County Treasurer: Jennifer Goudreau
 Register of Deeds: Mary Jo Savard
 County Surveyor: Jeffrey M. Davis

(information as of April 2015)

Historical markers
There are 34 official state historical markers in the county:
 Across the Peninsula
 American Fur Company Store
 Battlefield of 1814
 Biddle House
 Bois Blanc Island
 British Cannon
 British Landing
 Early Missionary Bark Chapel
 Epoufette
 Fort de Buade
 Fort Holmes
 Grand Hotel
 Gros Cap Island & St. Helena Island
 Historic Fort Mackinac
 Indian Dormitory
 Island House (Mackinac Island)
 Lake Michigan
 Lake View Hotel
 Little Stone Church
 Mackinac Conference
 Mackinac Island
 Mackinac Straits
 Market Street
 Mission Church
 Mission House
 Northernmost Point of Lake Michigan
 Old Agency House
 Round Island Lighthouse
 Sainte Anne Church
 St. Ignace
 St. Ignace Mission
 Skull Cave
 Trinity Church (Mackinac Island)
 Wawashkamo Golf Club

Media

Newspapers
The Mackinac Island Town Crier is the weekly seasonal newspaper of Mackinac Island.
The St. Ignace News is the weekly newspaper for the Upper Peninsula area of the Mackinac Straits.

Television
The following television stations can be received in St. Ignace:
Channel 4:WTOM-TV "TV 7&4" (NBC) (Cheboygan) (simulcasted in Channel 7, Harrietta)
Channel 8:WGTQ "ABC 29&8" (ABC) (Goetzville) (simulcasted in Channel 29, Kalkaska)
Channel 10:WWUP-TV "9&10 News" (CBS) (Goetzville) (simulcasted in Channel 9, Tustin)

Radio
The following stations can be heard in St. Ignace:

FM

AM

Attractions
British Landing
Fort Mackinac
Garlyn Zoo
Straits State Park
 Deer Ranch
Castle Rock (Michigan)

Communities

Cities
 Mackinac Island
 St. Ignace (county seat)

Civil townships

 Bois Blanc Township
 Brevort Township
 Clark Township
 Garfield Township
 Hendricks Township
 Holmes Township (Defunct)
 Hudson Township
 Marquette Township
 Moran Township
 Newton Township
 Portage Township
 St. Ignace Township

Census-designated place 

 Naubinway

Unincorporated communities

 Allenville
 Brevort
 Caffey
 Caffey Corner
 Cedarville
 Charles
 Curtis
 Engadine
 Epoufette
 Evergreen Shores
 Garnet
 Gilchrist
 Gould City
 Gros Cap
 Hessel
 Huntspur
 Kenneth
 Millecoquins
 Moran
 Ozark
 Patrick Landing
 Pickford
 Pointe Aux Pins
 Pontchartrain Shores
 Port Dolomite
 Port Inland
 Rexton
 Rockview
 Simmons

Indian reservations
 The Sault Tribe of Chippewa Indians, which is headquartered in Sault Ste. Marie in Chippewa County to the north, occupies two small territories within Mackinac County.  One is located in St. Ignace Township about 3 miles (4.8 km) north of the city of St. Ignace on the shores of Lake Huron.  The other portion is located in rural northwest Clark Township.

Education
School districts include:

K-12:
 Engadine Consolidated Schools
 Les Cheneaux Community Schools
 Mackinac Island Public Schools
 Pickford Public Schools
 Rudyard Area Schools
 St. Ignace Area Schools
 Tahquamenon Area Schools

Elementary:
 Bois Blanc Pines School District
 Moran Township School District

See also
 List of Michigan State Historic Sites in Mackinac County, Michigan
National Register of Historic Places listings in Mackinac County, Michigan

References

Bibliography

External links
Mackinac County government
Mackinac County Profile, Sam M Cohodas Regional Economist, Tawni Hunt Ferrarini, Ph.D.
A History of the Upper Peninsula of Michigan, Fuller, George N.
St. Ignace visitor's bureau

 
Michigan counties
1849 establishments in Michigan
Populated places established in 1849